80000 series may refer to:

Japanese train types 

 Kintetsu 80000 series EMU
 Shin-Keisei 80000 series EMU

Other train types 

 TCDD HT80000 High speed trainsets for the Turkish State Railways

Electric multiple units of Japan